Withdrawal time, as relating to veterinary medicine, is defined as the time required after administration of a drug to a dairy cow needed to assure that drug residues in the marketable milk is below a determined maximum residue limit (MRL). This term is often used more broadly to describe the time needed after drug administration to any food animal where drug residue may be found in marketed meats, eggs, organs, or other edible products.

Notes

Further reading
Concordet, D and P.L. Toutain (1997) "The withdrawal time estimation of veterinary drugs revisited" Journal of Veterinary Pharmacology and Therapeutics 20 (5), 380–386. 
Eiichi, Kokue. (2006) "On a new withdrawal time of veterinary drugs under Positive List System" Journal of Livestock Medicine 516, 363–365. Journal Code:X0028A. 
Fisch, R.D. (2000) "Withdrawal time estimation of veterinary drugs: extending the range of statistical methods" Journal of Veterinary Pharmacology and Therapeutics 23 (3), 159–162. 

Veterinary medicine